"Bottoms Up" is a song by Scottish band Middle of the Road, released as a single in September 1972. It failed to chart in the UK, but continued the band's success in Europe, becoming a top-ten hit in several countries.

Track listings
7"
 "Bottoms Up" – 3:07
 "See the Sky" – 3:24

Charts

Weekly charts

Year-end charts

References

1972 singles
Middle of the Road songs
RCA Victor singles
1972 songs